Sauviac is a commune in the Gers department in southwestern France.

Geography

Localisation

Hydrology 
The Petite Baïse forms part of the commune's eastern border.

Population

See also
Communes of the Gers department

References

Communes of Gers